Aziz Driouche (born 13 November 1977 in Boujad) is a Moroccan long-distance runner.

At the 2000 World Cross Country Championships he finished eighteenth in the short race, while the Moroccan team of which he was a part took a bronze medal in the team competition. Competing in the 3000 metres steeplechase during track season, he finished fifth at the 1999 Summer Universiade and fourth at the 2001 Summer Universiade, the latter in a personal best time of 8:25.69 minutes.

He has a degree in mechanical engineering from Kagos Kashima University, Japan.

External links

IAAF Focus on Africans

1977 births
Living people
People from Boujad
Moroccan male long-distance runners
Moroccan male steeplechase runners
Moroccan male cross country runners
Japan Championships in Athletics winners
20th-century Moroccan people
21st-century Moroccan people